Quzlu (also Romanized as Qūzlū; also known as Qūzollū and Qūzūllū) is a village in Ujan-e Sharqi Rural District, Tekmeh Dash District, Bostanabad County, East Azerbaijan Province, Iran. At the 2006 census, its population was 262, in 52 families.

References 

Populated places in Bostanabad County